Croatia competed at the 2019 World Aquatics Championships in Gwangju, South Korea from 12 to 28 July.

Medalists

Diving

Croatia's diving team consisted of 2 athletes (1 male and 1 female).

Swimming

Croatia entered 11 swimmers.

Men

Women

Water polo

Men's tournament

Team roster

Marko Bijač
Marko Macan
Loren Fatović
Luka Lončar
Maro Joković
Hrvoje Benić
Ante Vukičević
Andro Bušlje
Lovre Miloš
Josip Vrlić
Anđelo Šetka
Javier Gadea Garcia
Ivan Marcelić
Coach: Ivica Tucak

Group B

Quarterfinals

Semifinals

Third place game

References

World Aquatics Championships
2019
Nations at the 2019 World Aquatics Championships